The Speaker of the Jatiya Sangsad is the presiding officer of the Parliament of Bangladesh. The speaker is elected generally in the first meeting of the parliament following general elections by Members of Parliament. Serving for a term of five years, the speaker chosen from sitting members of the parliament, and is by convention a member of the ruling party or alliance.

Shirin Sharmin Chaudhury of the Awami League is the current Speaker who presides over the 11th Jatiya Sangsad.

Powers and functions
In exercise of her powers whether vested in her by the Constitution, the Rules of Procedure or any other law, the Speaker of Jatiyo Shangshad like her counterparts in any parliamentary democracy of the Westminster model, assumes a neutral role. She conducts, but does not take part in, the proceedings of the House. The Speaker cannot vote on any motion under discussion in the House. Only in case of a tie or equality of votes, she has to exercise her casting vote so as to help the House avoid a stalemate and arrive at a discussion.
The powers and functions of the Speaker emanate from the Constitution and the Rules of Procedure. Some statutes have also vested him with some powers, duties and responsibilities. The constitutional powers and responsibilities of the Speaker include the following:
   The Speaker performs the functions of the President, if there is a temporary vacancy in that office or if the President is unable to perform her functions until a President is elected or the President resumes her duties, as the case may be;
   The Speaker administers oath to members of parliament or nominates someone to do so;
    A person elected as Member of Parliament has to take oath of her office within 90 days of his election or lose her seat. The Speaker can extend this period for good cause;
    Should a dispute arise as to the leadership of a parliamentary party, the Speaker has been invested with powers to resolve the dispute following the procedure laid down in clause (2) of Article 70 and determine its leadership by the majority of votes through a division;
    The Speaker causes a notification to be issued by the Parliament Secretariat declaring the seat of a member of Parliament vacant on account of death, resignation, failure to take oath within 90 days of her election or within the time extended for this purpose by the Speaker, absence from Parliament without leave for ninety consecutive sitting days;
    The Speaker also causes similar notification to be issued when a member resigns from, or votes against, the party which had nominated him/her as a candidate at the election or if a member earns any disqualification that make a person ineligible for election as a member of parliament. If, however, any dispute arises on these matters, the Speaker refers the matter to the Election Commission for a decision;
    The Speaker authenticates all Bills passed in Parliament when they are presented to the President for his assent. If a Bill bears a certificate under the hand of the Speaker that it is a 'money bill
 then that certificate is conclusive for all purposes and cannot be questioned in any court.
Enormous powers and responsibilities have been given to the Speaker by the Rules of Procedure of Jatiyo Shangshad. The following is only a short list of those powers and responsibilities that the Speaker enjoys or shoulders in the conduct of business and other related matters:  
    He decides the admissibility of notices for questions, resolutions, petitions, questions of privileges, short discussions, half-an-hour discussions, adjournment motions, call attention and all other notices intended to be raised in the House for a discussion;
    The Speaker decides all points of order raised in the House;
    He decides the duration of discussion on any subject, if it is not already decided by the rules. He allocates time for each speaker to speak on a subject;
    He can apply the guillotine on discussions on cut motions on demands for grants so as to put the demands direct to vote;
    He reads out messages of the President received on a Bill returned by him for reconsideration and if the Parliament is not in session he gets the message published in the Bulletin and lays it in the House in its first sitting after receipt of the message;
    He can expunge any word uttered in the House which he considers to be un-parliamentary;
    He nominates four important committees of the House and he himself is the ex officio Chairman of two important committees viz. the Business Advisory Committee and the Committee on Rules of Procedure;
    He can convene a meeting of a standing committee on a Ministry if such meeting is not called by its chairman within the time prescribed by the rules;
    The Speaker can authorise a meeting of a parliamentary committee to be held outside the precincts of Parliament;
    The Speaker gives final decision as to whether a document is relevant or not for production before a parliamentary committee;
    The Speaker has to be informed if a member of parliament is arrested or when he is released from custody.
    In case of a disorderly conduct of a member in the House, the Speaker can direct him to go out of the House and take other disciplinary action against him;
    The Speaker controls entry into those parts of the House which are exclusively reserved for members;
    If any matter arises in connection with the business of the House or in the committees for which no provision exists in the Rules of Procedure, the matter is decided by the Speaker.

The Speaker has been vested with a number of powers and responsibilities under different statutes. Under the Parliament Secretariat Act 1994, the administrative responsibilities of the Parliament Secretariat is vested in him. He is the final authority for the sanction of expenditure out of the budget of the Parliament Secretariat. He also nominates, such number of members of parliament, as prescribed in the relevant law, to the senates of 7 major Universities of the country. Besides, there are other statutory bodies and institutions to whose governing bodies she nominates members of parliament as prescribed by law.

Election
At the first sitting after a general election, Parliament presided over by the outgoing Speaker or, in his absence, by the Deputy Speaker, proceeds first to elect a Speaker and a Deputy Speaker in the manner laid down in the Rules of Procedure. A person however cannot preside over his own election. After the election of the Speaker and the Deputy Speaker, the House is adjourned for a short period so as to enable the newly elected Speaker and Deputy Speaker to take oath of their office. The House then meets with the new Speaker presiding.

Tenure
The Speaker and the Deputy Speaker are deemed to have assumed their offices as soon as they take oath from the President after their election and continue in their offices until their respective successors take over generally at the commencement of a new Parliament. In the constitutional arrangement of Bangladesh, as soon as a care-taker government comes into power following the dissolution of Parliament and the Prime Minister and the members of the Cabinet, the Leader and the Deputy Leader of the Opposition and the Chief Whip and Whips of Parliament are deemed to have relieved themselves of their responsibilities. Only the Speaker and the Deputy Speaker continue in office as a link between one Parliament and the next.

Speakers and Deputy Speakers

Sources
Official website of the Jatiya Sangsad

Speakers of the Jatiya Sangsad